Henry Bensley Wells MBE (12 January 1891 – 4 July 1967) was an English judge and a rowing coxswain who competed for Great Britain in the 1912 Summer Olympics.

Wells was educated at Winchester College and Magdalen College, Oxford. He coxed the Oxford boat in the Boat Race from 1911 to 1914. He joined Leander Club and in 1912 he coxed the Leander eight which won the gold medal for Great Britain rowing at the 1912 Summer Olympics. The Leander eight beat the crew from New College, Oxford, by one length in the Olympic final at Stockholm.

Wells was called to the Bar by Gray’s Inn in 1914. On the outbreak of World War I, he joined the 6th London Brigade and was awarded the MBE in 1919. He was appointed a County Court Judge in 1934 and retired in 1958.

See also
List of Oxford University Boat Race crews

References

External links
 
 
 

1891 births
1967 deaths
People educated at Winchester College
Alumni of Magdalen College, Oxford
British Army personnel of World War I
20th-century English judges
English Olympic medallists
British male rowers
Members of the Order of the British Empire
Olympic rowers of Great Britain
Rowers at the 1912 Summer Olympics
Olympic gold medallists for Great Britain
Olympic medalists in rowing
Coxswains (rowing)
Members of Leander Club
Oxford University Boat Club rowers
Medalists at the 1912 Summer Olympics
County Court judges (England and Wales)